Anthony Daly may refer to:

Anthony W. Daly (1904–1960), American judge, lawyer, and politician
Anthony Daly (Whiteboy) (died 1820), Irish rebel
Anthony Daly (hurler) (born 1969), Irish hurling player
Anthony Daly (cricketer) (born 1969), cricketer
Anthony Daly (footballer) (1874–1942), Australian rules footballer
Tony Daly (born 1966), Australian rugby union player

See also
Tony Daley (born 1967), English footballer